Danny Dias (c. 1983 – June 4, 2017) was an American activist and reality television personality. Dias starred on season 13 on MTV's Road Rules, Road Rules: X-Treme, in 2004. In 2005, he returned to MTV in Bunim/Murray Productions' spinoff Real World/Road Rules Challenge, The Gauntlet 2. He later co-founded an AIDS research charity.

Early life and Career
Dias was born in Linden, New Jersey. He majored in music education at Westminster Choir College, a music conservatory affiliated with Rider University in Princeton, which he attended from 2001 to 2003. Dias, who was openly gay, was cast in season 13 of MTV's Road Rules while he was still attending college. Road Rules: X-Treme, which was filmed in an RV in Argentina and Chile, aired in 2004. The season cast included Dias, as well as Derrick Kosinski, Jodi Weatherton, Ibis Nieves, and Patrick Maloney. However, Dias was voted out in Episode 6 as a punishment for losing a mission and was replaced by Nick Haggart.

Dias returned to MTV for Real World/Road Rules Challenge: The Gauntlet 2, which aired from 2005 to 2006. He was eliminated from the competition after four episodes.

Following his time on Road Rules, Dias studied acting and worked in finance. He also become an AIDS activist and co-founded the research charity, Generation Cure.

Death
Dias was found unconscious at his Flushing Avenue apartment in Bushwick, Brooklyn, on June 4, 2017, at the age of 34. Friends had reportedly not reached him for two days. He was pronounced dead by authorities at approximately 5 p.m., though a cause of death was initially unknown.

In August 2017, a spokesperson for the New York City Chief Medical Examiner’s office said he died from “complications of chronic substance abuse.”

References

1980s births
2017 deaths
Road Rules cast members
HIV/AIDS activists
LGBT people from New Jersey
LGBT people from New York (state)
People from Linden, New Jersey
People from Bushwick, Brooklyn
Westminster Choir College alumni
The Challenge (TV series) contestants
21st-century American LGBT people